Aitziber Juaristi Caballero is a Spanish retired women's association football player who featured as a defender, mainly for Athletic Bilbao in the Spanish First Division. She was a founding member of the team, with whom she also played the European Cup. She later coached the club's 'C' (second reserve) squad.

References

1976 births
Living people
Spanish women's footballers
Footballers from Getxo
Primera División (women) players
Athletic Club Femenino players
Atlético Madrid Femenino players
Athletic Bilbao non-playing staff
Women's association football defenders